KHBZ (102.9 FM, "New Country 102.9") is a radio station broadcasting a country music format. Licensed to Harrison, Arkansas, United States, the station is currently owned by Paul Coates and Mike Huckabee, through licensee Ozark Mountain Media Group, LLC.

References

External links

Country radio stations in the United States
HBZ
Harrison, Arkansas
1963 establishments in Arkansas
Radio stations established in 1963